The Sahitya Akademi Award is given by the Sahitya Akademi, India's national academy of letters, to one writer every year in each of the languages recognized by it, as well as for translations. No awards were given in 1956, 1957, 1959, 1960, 1962 and 1968.

Sahitya Akademi Award winners 
The following is a List of winners of the Sahitya Akademi Award for writings in the Odia language:

Sahitya Akademi Bal Sahitya Puraskar Winners
The following is a List of winners of the Sahitya Akademi Bal Sahitya Puraskar:

Akademi Yuva Puraskar Winners

The following is a List of winners of the Akademi Yuva Puraskar:

See also

 List of Sahitya Akademi Translation Prize winners for Odia

References

Sahitya Akademi Award
Odia

Odia-language literary awards